Metasepia is a small genus of small cuttlefish from the Pacific Ocean. The two members of this genus are characterised by a small, thick, diamond-shaped cuttlebone.

Species
This genus contains two known species:
Pfeffer's flamboyant cuttlefish, Metasepia pfefferi
paintpot cuttlefish, Metasepia tullbergi

References

 Norman, M.D. 2000. Cephalopods: A World Guide. ConchBooks.
 Ross, R. 2010. Aquarium Invertebrates: Metasepia pfefferi – the aptly named Flamboyant Cuttlefish. Advanced Aquarist's Online Magazine.

External links
 

Cuttlefish
Cephalopod genera
Taxa named by William Evans Hoyle